Ponapella pihapiha is a species of minute snail with an operculum, an aquatic gastropod mollusk in the family Assimineidae. This species is endemic to Micronesia.

References

Assimineidae
Fauna of Micronesia
Gastropods described in 1946
Taxonomy articles created by Polbot